A crossbow is a projectile-shooting weapon. 

Crossbow may also refer to:

Business
 Crossbow Technology, a California-based electronics company

Media and entertainment
 Crossbow (TV series), based on William Tell
 Crossbow (video game)
 Crossbow (short film), an Australian coming-of-age drama
 Crossbow (journal), a UK conservative publication

Military
 Operation Crossbow, a World War II campaign
 Operation Crossbow (film), based on the above operation
 , a destroyer in Britain's Royal Navy

Technology
 Crossbow, the project name for OpenSolaris Network Virtualization and Resource Control
 Crossbow, the code name for Windows Mobile 6.0

Transportation
 Crossbow (proa), an early 1970s asymmetrical catamaran
 Crossbow II (proa), a late 1970s successor craft
 KTM X-Bow (read as "Crossbow"), a sports car